Hurley Calister "Cal" Turner (May 28, 1915 – November 20, 2000) was an American businessman. He was the co-founder of Dollar General alongside his father.

Early life
Cal Turner was born on May 28, 1915 in Macon County, Tennessee. His father, James Luther Turner, was a traveling salesman who, during the Great Depression, found success selling-off store inventories before the stores had to close down.

Business career
Turner co-founded J. L. Turner & Son Wholesale with his father, J.L. Turner, in Scottsville, Kentucky in 1939. It later became known as Dollar General, a chain of dollar stores. He listed it on the New York Stock Exchange in 1968. He retired in 1989. By the time of his death, it had "4,800 discount stores in 25 states."

Philanthropy
Turner endowed the Turner Family Scholarships for Dollar General employees in 1999.

Personal life
Turner married Laura Katherine Goad. They had four children: Laura Dugas, Cal Turner Jr., Betty Campbell, Steve Turner. His wife predeceased him in 1988.

Death
Turner died on November 20, 2000 in Scottsville, Kentucky.

References

1915 births
2000 deaths
People from Macon County, Tennessee
People from Scottsville, Kentucky
Businesspeople from Tennessee
Philanthropists from Tennessee
American company founders
Turner family
20th-century American philanthropists
Dollar General
20th-century American businesspeople
American businesspeople in retailing